Peter Vaughan Jones MBE (born 1942) is a Cambridge graduate with a doctorate on Homer. He is a former senior lecturer in Classics at the University of Newcastle upon Tyne, and co-founded with Jeannie Cohen the Friends of Classics charity. He used to be a teacher but is now employed as a writer, journalist and broadcaster. He is the brother of the late David E. H. Jones.

Spokesman for the national Co-ordinating Committee for Classics, Jones penned the series QED and Eureka for the Daily Telegraph. These pieces were subsequently published as Learn Latin and Learn Ancient Greek by Duckworth, which has also accounted for his Classics in Translation (again from the Daily Telegraph) and Ancient and Modern (from his weekly column in The Spectator). Jones has collaborated for Cambridge on Reading Greek and Reading Latin.

He has published a book called "Vote For Caesar" (2008) about how ancient civilisations have solved the problems of today. Awarded the MBE in 1983, Jones has written widely on Homer.


Bibliography

Books
 Jones, Peter (1998). Learn Ancient Greek. London: Duckworth & Co.
 Jones, Peter (2013). Veni, Vidi, Vici: Everything You Ever Wanted to Know about the Romans But Were Afraid to Ask. Atlantic Books.
 Jones, Peter (2015). Eureka. Atlantic Books.
 Jones, Peter (2016). Quid Pro Quo: What the Romans Really Gave the English Language. Atlantic Books.
 Jones, Peter (2018). Memento Mori: What the Romans Can Tell Us About Old Age and Death. Atlantic Books.
 Jones, Peter (2019). Vox Populi: Everything You Ever Wanted to Know about the Classical World But Were Afraid to Ask. Atlantic Books.

Ancient and Modern columns in The Spectator

See also
The Teaching of Classics ed. James Morwood, Foreword by Peter Jones (Cambridge University Press, 2003) 
English translations of Homer: Peter Jones

References

British classical scholars
Living people
1942 births
Classical scholars of Newcastle University
Scholars of ancient Greek literature
The Spectator people
Members of the Order of the British Empire
Presidents of the Classical Association